The 2008 Andalusian regional election was held on Sunday, 9 March 2008, to elect the 8th Parliament of the autonomous community of Andalusia. All 109 seats in the Parliament were up for election. The election was held simultaneously with the 2008 Spanish general election.

Incumbent President Manuel Chaves from the Spanish Socialist Workers' Party (PSOE–A) was re-elected for a sixth term in office with a slightly reduced majority. Final results showed a major breakthrough by the People's Party (PP), which gained 10 seats from 37 to 47 and scored its best result in the community at the time. United Left (IULV–CA) remained stagnant with 6 seats, whereas the Andalusian Party (PA) suffered a major drop in support and failed to enter the regional parliament for the first time.

Overview

Electoral system
The Parliament of Andalusia was the devolved, unicameral legislature of the autonomous community of Andalusia, having legislative power in regional matters as defined by the Spanish Constitution of 1978 and the regional Statute of Autonomy, as well as the ability to vote confidence in or withdraw it from a regional president.

Voting for the Parliament was on the basis of universal suffrage, which comprised all nationals over 18 years of age, registered in Andalusia and in full enjoyment of their political rights. The 109 members of the Parliament of Andalusia were elected using the D'Hondt method and a closed list proportional representation, with an electoral threshold of three percent of valid votes—which included blank ballots—being applied in each constituency. Seats were allocated to constituencies, corresponding to the provinces of Almería, Cádiz, Córdoba, Granada, Huelva, Jaén, Málaga and Seville, with each being allocated an initial minimum of eight seats and the remaining 45 being distributed in proportion to their populations (provided that the number of seats in each province did not exceed two times that of any other).

The use of the D'Hondt method might result in a higher effective threshold, depending on the district magnitude.

Election date
The term of the Parliament of Andalusia expired four years after the date of its previous election, unless it was dissolved earlier. The election decree was required to be issued no later than the twenty-fifth day prior to the date of expiry of parliament and published on the following day in the Official Gazette of the Regional Government of Andalusia (BOJA), with election day taking place on the fifty-fourth day from publication barring any date within from 1 July to 31 August. The previous election was held on 14 March 2004, which meant that the legislature's term would have expired on 14 March 2008. The election decree was required to be published in the BOJA no later than 19 February 2008, with the election taking place on the fifty-fourth day from publication, setting the latest possible election date for the Parliament on Sunday, 13 April 2008.

The president had the prerogative to dissolve the Parliament of Andalusia and call a snap election, provided that no motion of no confidence was in process and that dissolution did not occur before one year had elapsed since the previous one. In the event of an investiture process failing to elect a regional president within a two-month period from the first ballot, the Parliament was to be automatically dissolved and a fresh election called.

Background
With the Spanish Socialist Workers' Party (PSOE) regaining its absolute majority in Andalusia in the 2004 election, Manuel Chaves was able to govern alone again, after 10 years of minority government, having relied on the support of the Andalusian Party in the previous 8 years. Teófila Martínez, who had been PP candidate for President of the Regional Government of Andalusia in the previous two elections (1996 and 2000), was replaced by Javier Arenas as head of the Andalusian People's Party (PP). Arenas had been PP candidate in the 1994 and 1996 elections, but left the PP regional leadership in order to become Spain's Minister of Labor and Social Affairs in the Aznar cabinet and, later, Secretary-General of the People's Party.

Concurrently in 2004, José Luis Rodríguez Zapatero from PSOE was elected as Spain's new prime minister, after unexpectedly winning the 2004 general election. This meant that, for the first time since 1996, both the regional and national governments were ruled by the same party.

Parties and candidates
The electoral law allowed for parties and federations registered in the interior ministry, coalitions and groupings of electors to present lists of candidates. Parties and federations intending to form a coalition ahead of an election were required to inform the relevant Electoral Commission within ten days of the election call, whereas groupings of electors needed to secure the signature of at least one percent of the electorate in the constituencies for which they sought election, disallowing electors from signing for more than one list of candidates.

Below is a list of the main parties and electoral alliances which contested the election:

Campaign

Election debates

Opinion polls
The tables below list opinion polling results in reverse chronological order, showing the most recent first and using the dates when the survey fieldwork was done, as opposed to the date of publication. Where the fieldwork dates are unknown, the date of publication is given instead. The highest percentage figure in each polling survey is displayed with its background shaded in the leading party's colour. If a tie ensues, this is applied to the figures with the highest percentages. The "Lead" column on the right shows the percentage-point difference between the parties with the highest percentages in a poll.

Graphical summary

Voting intention estimates
The table below lists weighted voting intention estimates. Refusals are generally excluded from the party vote percentages, while question wording and the treatment of "don't know" responses and those not intending to vote may vary between polling organisations. When available, seat projections determined by the polling organisations are displayed below (or in place of) the percentages in a smaller font; 55 seats were required for an absolute majority in the Parliament of Andalusia.

Voting preferences
The table below lists raw, unweighted voting preferences.

Voter turnout
The table below shows registered vote turnout on election day without including voters from the Census of Absent-Residents (CERA).

Results

Overall

Distribution by constituency

Aftermath

Government formation

2009 investiture

On 7 April 2009, Manuel Chaves resigned as regional President in order to become Third Deputy Prime Minister in the Second Zapatero Government, being succeeded as acting officeholder by Vice President Gaspar Zarrías. On 22 April, José Antonio Griñán was elected as new President by the Parliament of Andalusia.

Notes

References
Opinion poll sources

Other

2008 in Andalusia
Andalusia
Regional elections in Andalusia
March 2008 events in Europe